Sergio and Estíbaliz were a Spanish vocal duo, formed by Sergio Blanco Rivas (17 November 1948 – 15 February 2015) and Estíbaliz Uranga Amézaga (9 December 1952) who also worked with groups Mocedades and El Consorcio. They were also known for their participation in the Eurovision Song Contest 1975. Both were born in Bilbao.

Having met in 1968, the couple joined vocal group Mocedades, with whom they recorded three albums before leaving in 1972 to concentrate on a career as a duo.  They released their first self-titled album the following year, which proved a success and was followed by further albums at approximately yearly intervals throughout the 1970s.

In 1975 Sergio and Estíbaliz were chosen internally by broadcaster Televisión Española as the Spanish representatives for that year's Eurovision Song Contest with the song "Tú volverás" ("You Will Return").  At the 20th Eurovision Song Contest, held in Stockholm on 22 March, "Tú volverás" placed 10th of the 19 entries.  The song became a major hit both in Spain and Latin America, where they became very popular, leading to the release of an album of Latin American songs in 1977.

The couple had married in 1975, and took a career break in the early 1980s during which Estíbaliz gave birth to a daughter.  Returning in 1983, they again began releasing albums on a regular basis, with 1985's Cuidado con la noche proving the most successful of their career.  Their last album as a duo was released in 1992.

Since 1993 the duo were members of the group El Consorcio which also includes former Mocedades members  Amaya and Iñaki Uranga (sister and brother to Estíbaliz) and Carlos Zubiaga. They released eight albums as members of El Consorcio. In 2013, Sergio left El Consorcio due to a "serious illness". El Consorcio began a farewell tour in 2014.

Sergio Blanco died on 15 February 2015 in Tres Cantos, Community of Madrid, at the age of 66.

Albums discography 
With Mocedades
1969: Pange Lingua
1970: Más allá
1971: Otoño
Sergio and Estíbaliz
1973: Sergio y Estíbaliz
1974: Piel
1975: Tú volverás
1976: Quién compra una canción
1976: Queda más vida
1977: Canciones sudamericanas
1979: Beans
1983: Agua
1985: Cuidado con la noche
1986: Sí señor
1988: Déjame vivir con alegría
1989: De par en par
1992: Planeta Tierra
With El Consorcio
1994: Lo que nunca muere
1995: Peticiones del oyente
1996: Programa doble
1998: Cuba
2000: Las canciones de mi vida
2003: En vivo desde el corazón de México
2005: De ida y vuelta
2008: Querido Juan

References

External links 
 Sergio and Estíbaliz website
 El Consorcio website 

Spanish musical duos
Eurovision Song Contest entrants for Spain
Eurovision Song Contest entrants of 1975
Married couples
20th-century Spanish musicians
Ariola Records artists
Male–female musical duos